Brontictuzumab (INN; development code OMP-52M51) is a humanized monoclonal antibody designed for the treatment of cancer.

This drug was developed by OncoMed Pharmaceuticals.

References 

Monoclonal antibodies